Paramjyoti Public School is located in Amalapuram, East Godavari District, Andhra Pradesh, India. The school offers both ICSE and SSC curriculum.

History:
In the early 1980s Pastor Carl Komanapalli used to send his children Rosalyn and Joshua to a school 70 km away from Amalapuram as there was no school that taught in English. In 1985 he brought their children home for their summer break and when it was time to leave, the children and parents didn't want to separate again. So Carl asked local schools to start English school, and no one came forward. Rev. Carl wrote to his brother Bishop. Ernest Komanapalli the founder of sister organization, Manna Ministries, suggesting they open an English medium school. Bishop. Ernest Komanapalli liked the idea and vision and asked him to proceed.

Under Pastor Carl, the school successfully started its first year in 1985 with over 250 children, and in 1986, Paramjyoti Foundation was formed to honor both his and Pastor Carl's father in law, Apostle P.L. Paramjyoti. The school purchased 9 acres of agricultural fields with funds donated from Bishops Ernest & Rachel Komanapalli. Along with the School's property, Bishops Ernest & Rachel Komanapalli and Pastors Carl & Sharon Komanapalli mortgaged their personal assets to secure a loan to build the school building. Rev. Carl Komanapalli has directed the schools and its colleges since its inception in 1985 and his son Joshua Komanapalli has taken the mantle since 2014 to chart the future for the next 35 years.

References

Schools in East Godavari district
1985 establishments in Andhra Pradesh
Educational institutions established in 1985